Bill Schultz (1891-1975) was an Australian professional rugby league footballer who played in the 1910s and 1920s. An Australia national and New South Wales state representative prop forward, he played his club football in Sydney for Balmain, with whom he won six premierships between 1915 and 1924.

Playing career
Of German and Irish descent, Schultz was a Balmain junior who also played Australian Rules football at the local Christian Brothers with another future Balmain champion, Charles ‘Chook’ Fraser. Balmain went through the 1915 NSWRFL season undefeated, and Schultz tasted his first premiership success with the club. The following year he played for Balmain at prop forward in the 1916 NSWRFL season's premiership final victory against South Sydney. He again won the premiership with Balmain in the 1917 NSWRFL season.

Chang Schultz was first selected for the Australian national team in 1919, becoming Kangaroo No. 106, and winning another premiership with Balmain that year. He appeared in all three Tests in Australia's Ashes-winning series in 1920, and was again a premiership-winner with Balmain. He was selected to go on the 1921–22 Kangaroo tour of Great Britain, playing in the second Ashes series test victory against the Lions, and in the third test loss, which cost them the title. Schultz played for Balmain at prop forward in the 1924 NSWRFL season's premiership final victory against South Sydney.

References

1891 births
1975 deaths
Australian people of German descent
Australian rugby league players
Balmain Tigers players
Australia national rugby league team players
New South Wales rugby league team players
Rugby league props
Rugby league locks
Rugby league players from Sydney